The Pretoria trolleybus system was part of the public transport network in Pretoria, South Africa, for more than 30 years in the mid-twentieth century. The trolleybus system was opened in 1939 and was closed in 1972, lasting for over 32 years.

See also

History of Pretoria
List of trolleybus systems

References

Further reading

External links

Flickr image of Pretoria trolleybuses in the city centre, 1969
Flickr image of a Pretoria trolleybus in the suburbs, 1989

Transport in Pretoria
Pretoria
Pretoria
History of Pretoria